The brown-winged kingfisher (Pelargopsis amauroptera) is a species of bird in the subfamily Halcyoninae.

It is found along the north and eastern coasts of the Bay of Bengal, occurring in the countries of Bangladesh, India, Malaysia, Myanmar and Thailand. In India, it has been mainly reported from the Sundarbans region but records from further south near Chilka exist.

Its natural habitat is subtropical or tropical mangrove forests.

References

brown-winged kingfisher
Birds of Bangladesh
Birds of Myanmar
Sundarbans
brown-winged kingfisher
Taxonomy articles created by Polbot